William MacArthur Mackenzie (27 March 1957 – 22 January 1997) was a Scottish singer and songwriter, known for his distinctive high tenor voice. He was the co-founder and lead vocalist of post-punk and new wave band the Associates. He also had a brief solo career releasing his debut studio album, Outernational, in 1992, his only solo album released during his lifetime.

Biography
William MacArthur Mackenzie was born on 27 March 1957 in Dundee, Scotland. As a youngster, he lived on Park Avenue in the Stobswell area of the city. He attended St Mary's Forebank Primary School and St Michael's Secondary School.  He led a peripatetic lifestyle, decamping to New Zealand at the age of 16, and travelling across America aged 17. Here he married Chloe Dummar, the sister-in-law of his Aunt Veronica. While MacKenzie was quoted as saying the marriage was made to stave off deportation so that he could sing with the New Orleans Gospel Choir – calling his wife a 'Dolly Parton type' – Dummar still believes the pair were in love. He left her after three months of marriage and returned to Dundee, and the two never had contact again. Chloe Dummar filed for divorce in 1980, and MacKenzie did not contest the filing. (Chloe's brother was Melvin Dummar, who claimed to be the "one sixteenth" beneficiary of the estate of Howard Hughes until the case was thrown out in 1978.)

MacKenzie returned to Scotland where he met Alan Rankine and in 1976 formed the Ascorbic Ones. They changed the name to Mental Torture and finally the Associates in 1979. Rankine left the Associates in 1982, but MacKenzie continued to work under the name for several years until he began releasing material under his own name in the 1990s.

Collaborations
Mackenzie also collaborated with many other artists during his career. Mackenzie had a fruitful partnership with Paul Haig of Josef K, the result being low key dates in Glasgow and Edinburgh during the mid-1980s, which mixed their own best known songs with covers of songs such as Sly and the Family Stone's "Runnin' Away" and Yoko Ono's "Walking on Thin Ice". Later the pair united to perform "Amazing Grace" on a Scots Hogmanay television programme, and each donated a song to the other's forthcoming studio album. "Chained" proved a highlight on the next Haig album, although Mackenzie's version of "Reach the Top" remained unreleased after the Associates' The Glamour Chase project was shelved by WEA. Following Mackenzie's untimely death in 1997 an entire album of Haig and Mackenzie material, Memory Palace, appeared on Haig's own label Rhythm of Life.

In 1987, he wrote lyrics for two tracks on Yello's fifth studio album One Second: "Moon on Ice", which he sang himself, and "The Rhythm Divine", which was sung by Shirley Bassey and was released as a single. A version sung by MacKenzie was released on the cassette and CD versions of Associates' Popera compilation album). MacKenzie also collaborated with B.E.F. (British Electric Foundation) for their two albums Music of Quality and Distinction Volume One (1982) & Volume Two (1991). His final recording was the song "Pain in Any Language", with electronic music group Apollo 440. The band made a dedication to Mackenzie in the album notes to the studio album Electro Glide in Blue (1997).

Death and legacy
On 22 January 1997, Mackenzie killed himself by overdosing on a combination of paracetamol and prescription medication in the garden shed of his father's house in Auchterhouse, Angus. He was 39 years old. Depression and the death of his mother are believed to have contributed to his suicide.

He was the subject of a biography by Tom Doyle, The Glamour Chase, in 1998.

Siouxsie Sioux, a friend of Mackenzie, wrote the song "Say", revealing in the lyrics that they were going to meet just before his death. The song was released as a single by the Creatures in 1999, peaking at No. 72 on the UK Singles Chart. The Cure song "Cut Here" in 2001, written by Robert Smith, a friend of Mackenzie, is about the regret Smith felt about seeing Mackenzie a few weeks before his death backstage at a Cure concert, and not giving him any of his "precious time" and fobbing him off. For her fifth studio album Medúlla (2004), Icelandic singer Björk considered singing a beyond the grave duet with Mackenzie using recordings given to her by his father, but eventually decided against it. In 2006, Norwegian singer Jenny Hval, under the name Rockettothesky, released her debut single "Barrie for Billy Mackenzie" as a tribute.

Between 9 and 27 June 2009, a play entitled Balgay Hill about the story of Mackenzie's life was showing at Dundee Repertory Theatre, in Mackenzie's home town. It tells the story of his life through the eyes of four fictional characters, and the title of the play derives from the name of the Dundee cemetery where Mackenzie was buried.

The novel Spying on Strange Men by Carole Morin, contains the following section:

"I checked my face in the mirror, opened the book about Billy Mackenzie.

One day at Billy's house his dad brought in a cake and Billy said, 'That cake is like your aunty's hat.'

'That image kept replaying in my mind, another memory of something I didn't witness, as James came out of the bathroom.

'What are you reading?' he asked.

'A book,' I said, flicking to the end where Billy kills himself and goes to sleep for ever in the dog basket."

Morin said in an interview:I was devastated by his death which is odd because I didn't know him. My husband did. Mackenzie's death affected me in a way that Ian Curtis's didn't. Curtis seemed born to die. Mackenzie should have outgrown his gloom and become an eccentric old man. I think our work is similar. It's the duality of glamour and spirituality in his voice that attracts me. His toughness and fragility; darkness and laughter. He could be a character from one of my books. I always meant to send him a copy of Dead Glamorous.

Discography

With the Associates

 The Affectionate Punch (1980)
 Fourth Drawer Down (1981)
 Sulk (1982)
 Perhaps (1985)
 Wild and Lonely (1990)
 The Glamour Chase (2002)

Solo

Albums
 Outernational (1992), Circa
 Beyond the Sun (1997), Nude – UK No. 64
 Memory Palace (credited with Paul Haig) (1999), Rhythm of Life
 Eurocentric (credited with Steve Aungle) (2001), Rhythm of Life
 Auchtermatic (2005), One Little Indian
 Transmission Impossible (2005), One Little Indian

Singles
 "Baby" (1992), Circa
 "Colours Will Come" (1992), Circa
 "Pastime Paradise" (1992), Circa – promotional release only

Guest vocals

Lead vocals
 BEF's Music of Quality and Distinction Volume One album: "Secret Life of Arabia" and "It's Over" (1982)
 Stephen Emmer's Vogue Estate album: duet with Martha Ladly on "Wish On" (1982)
 Annie Lennox: duet on "The Best of You"; the original Perhaps sessions version, the re-recorded album featured Eddi Reader (1985) †
 Sweden Through the Ages EP: It Helps to Cry (1986)
 Yello's Snowball and the Sound of Yello: "Life Is a Snowball" (1987); unreleased promo CD
 Yello's One Second album: "Moon On Ice" (1987) †
 Yello "The Rhythm Divine" (version 2): special limited edition 12" single (MERXR253) featuring MacKenzie's lead vocals in place of Shirley Bassey's (1987); the same recording later appeared on the Popera album (1990). "Norma Jean", a variation of "The Rhythm Divine" song with different lyrics originally recorded for an unfinished project by Yello's Dieter Meier about Marilyn Monroe, was released as track 9 from his "Auchtermatic" CD compilation (One Little Indian - TPLP442CD, 2004) 
 Uno's self-titled album: Cinemas of the World (1987)
 Holger Hiller's Oben Im Eck album: title track and version, "We Don't Write Anything On Paper or So", and "Whippets" single (1987)
 Yello's Baby album: "Capri Calling" (1991)
 BEF's Music of Quality and Distinction Volume Two album: "Free". (1991) "Free" also appears on the 1998 BEF 'Best Of' album, later reissued by Disky in 2001
 Loom's "Anacostia Bay" single (1996) † ‡
 Barry Adamson's Oedipus Schmoedipus album: "Achieved in the Valley of the Dolls" (1996) ‡
 Apollo 440's Electro Glide in Blue album: "Pain in Any Language" (1997) † ‡
 "Put This Right" – Co-written by Laurence Jay Cedar and Billy MacKenzie. (1996)
 "Deamanda" – Co-written by Laurence Jay Cedar and Billy MacKenzie. (1996)

† lyrics by Mackenzie
‡ also appear on Auchtermatic
 Unreleased tracks "Sinking Deeper" and "The Hungry Look" recorded 1980 under the name Strange News. Billy, Steve Reid and rhythm section Andy and Gavin. Only copies of tracks exist.

Backing vocals
 The track "Fields" on the Joy album by fellow Scottish band Skids: "Fields" single (7" and 12" mixes) (Virgin, 1981) also released on Skids' Dunfermline CD (1987)
 Yello's One Second album: the singles "Call It Love", "The Rhythm Divine", and 'Goldrush' (1987)
 Yello's Flag album:, the single "Of Course I'm Lying", and "Otto Di Catania" (1988)
 Jih's Take Me to the Girl single  >, title track plus "Come Summer Come Winter" and "Wake Up" (1988)
 Boris Grebenshchikov's Radio Silence album/single: "That Voice Again" (1989)
 Yello's Baby album: "Drive/Driven" and the single "Rubberbandman" (1991)
(6 of MacKenzie's Yello tracks later released on the Essential Yello album) (1992)
 Siobhan Fahey: "Do I Scare You" (1996) unreleased until 2004 when it first appeared on Shakespears Sister's 'Best Of' double CD, and then on the "3" album in 2005
 Peach – Audiopeach album: "Deep Down Together" and "Give Me Tomorrow" credited as the MacArthurettes with Caragh McKay (1998)
 Paul Haig "Listen to Me" single (1997)> = lyrics by MacKenzie

Other credits
 Orbidöig's "Nocturnal Operations" single: Mackenzie played tubular bells (1981) – this single was reissued in 1984, credited as the Sensational Creed
 Sweden Thru the Ages "It Helps to Cry" single, produced by Mackenzie (1986)
 Paul Haig Chain album: "Chained", lyrics by Mackenzie, performed by Haig (1989)

References

External links
  Details of 28 March 2007 London tribute concert
 
 
 

Beggars Banquet Records artists
British synth-pop new wave musicians
Scottish new wave musicians
Scottish tenors
20th-century Scottish male singers
Scottish singer-songwriters
Bisexual singers
British post-punk musicians
Male new wave singers
Scottish LGBT singers
Drug-related suicides in Scotland
People with mood disorders
Musicians from Dundee
The Associates (band) members
Warner Music Group artists
1957 births
20th-century Scottish musicians
1997 suicides
20th-century Scottish LGBT people